The Garonne (also , ; Occitan, Catalan, Basque, and , ; 
or ) is a river of southwest France and northern Spain.

Umayyad and  Aquitanian forces fought the Battle of the River Garonne in 732 beside the river near present-day Bordeaux.

Etymology
The name derives from Garumna, a Latinized version of the Aquitanian name meaning "stony river" ("kar" relating to "stone" and "-ona" relating to "river").

Geography

Sources
  

The Garonne's headwaters are to be found in the Aran Valley in the Spanish Pyrenees, though three different locations have been proposed as the true source: the Uelh deth Garona at Plan de Beret, the Ratera-Saboredo cirque ), or the slopes of Pic Aneto (Salterillo-Barrancs ravine  according to the season).

From this point a brook (called the Beret-Garona) runs for  until the bed of the main upper Garonne valley. The river runs for another  until the French border at Pont de Rei,  in total.

At the confluence, the Ruda-Garona carries  of water. The Ratera-Saboredo cirque has been pointed by many researchers as the origin of the Garonne.

Despite the lack of universal agreement upon definition for determining a stream's source, the United States Geological Survey, the National Geographic Society, and the Smithsonian Institution  agree that a stream's source should be considered as the most distant point (along watercourses from the river mouth) in the drainage basin from which water runs.

The Ratera-Saboredo cirque is the "most distant point (along watercourses from the river mouth) in the drainage basin from which water runs", and the source of the Garonne, according to the United States Geological Survey, the National Geographic Society, and the Smithsonian Institution convention upon determining a stream's source.

Course
The Garonne follows the Aran Valley northwards into France, flowing via Toulouse and Agen towards Bordeaux, where it meets the Gironde estuary. The Gironde flows into the Atlantic Ocean (Bay of Biscay). Along its course, the Garonne is joined by three other major rivers: the Ariège, the Tarn, and the Lot.  Just after Bordeaux, the Garonne meets the Dordogne at the Bec d'Ambès, forming the Gironde estuary, which after approximately  empties into the Atlantic Ocean. Other tributaries include the Save and the Gers.

The Garonne is one of the few rivers in the world that exhibit a tidal bore. Surfers and jet skiers could ride the tidal bore at least as far as the village of Cambes,  from the Atlantic, and even further upstream to Cadillac, although the tidal bore appears and disappears in response to changes in the channel bathymetry. In 2010 and 2012, some detailed field studies were conducted in the Garonne's Arcins channel between Arcins Island and the right bank close to Lastrene township. A striking feature of the field data sets was the large and rapid fluctuations in turbulent velocities and turbulent stresses during the tidal bore and flood flow.

European sea sturgeon conservation

The European sea sturgeon (Acipenser sturio), also known as the Atlantic sturgeon or common sturgeon, is now a Critically Endangered species (IUCN) status. Previously found on most coasts of Europe, it has now become so rare that they only breed in the Garonne river basin in France. Conservation projects are under way to save this fish from extinction via species reintroduction from aquaculture, with the first releases having been made in 1995.

Towns along the river
 Aran Valley (Spain): Vielha,  Bossòst
 Haute-Garonne (31): Saint-Gaudens, Muret, Toulouse
 Tarn-et-Garonne (82): Castelsarrasin
 Lot-et-Garonne (47): Agen, Marmande, Aiguillon
 Gironde (33): Langon, Bordeaux

Main tributaries
Following the flow of the river, from source to mouth:

 Pique
 Ourse
 Neste
 Salat
 Volp
 Arize
 Louge
 Ariège
 Touch
 Hers-Mort
 Save
 Gimone
 Tarn
 Arrats
 Barguelonne
 Auroue
 Séoune
 Gers
 Baïse
 Lot
 Avance
 Dropt
 Ciron
 Gat mort
 Devèze
 Jalle de Blanquefort

Navigation

The Garonne plays an important role in inland shipping. The river not only allows seagoing vessels to reach the port of Bordeaux but also forms part of the Canal des Deux Mers, linking the Mediterranean Sea and the Atlantic Ocean.

From the ocean, ships pass through the Gironde estuary up to the mouth of the Garonne (to the right of the Dordogne when sailing upstream). Ships continue on the tidal river Garonne up to the Pont de Pierre (stone bridge) in Bordeaux. Inland vessels continue upstream to Castets-en-Dorthe, where the Canal de Garonne joins the river. Prior to the building of the Canal lateral à la Garonne, between 1838 and 1856, shallow-draught boats used the Garonne itself as far as Toulouse. However, navigation on the upper river was very uncertain, and this stretch of the river is no longer considered navigable. Instead the lateral canal takes boats through 53 locks to the town of Toulouse, where the canal meets the Canal du Midi.

Hydrography 
The upstream part of the river, upstream from Toulouse depends primarily on snow and snow melt. The lower/downstream part is rain fed as well as its main tributaries.

The Garonne also feeds several channels/canals:

 The Saint-Martory canal – Saint-Martory water intake takes 10 m3/s from the river;
 The canal latéral à la Garonne – with the water intake in Toulouse by the Brienne canal.

SANDRE assigns to the Garonne a hydrographic identity number 0 --- 00000 and the generic code O --- 000014,15.

Floods 

A flood of the Garonne in 1930 broke the dike in Thivras (Marmande).

In Toulouse, the Garonne has been the cause of many floods, especially since its left bank is inhabited.

The earliest records of floods are from around 1177. It is also recorded to have flooded in 1220, 1258, 1430, 1523, 1536 and in 1589, 1608, 1658, 1673, 1675, 1709, 1712, 1727, 1750, 1772, 1788, 1804 and 1810. In 1772, the Garonne reached 8 meters 50. In the recent centuries, in 1827, 1835, 1855 and 1856/7.

In Toulouse, in 1827, the water level of the Garonne rose four meters above the ordinary level and filled the arches of the Pont de Pierre and Pont Neuf.

In 1835, the Garonne rose to five meters above normal and 35 meters above the low water level and flowed through the four arcs of the Pont de Pierre.

Flood of the Garonne in 1835: 7,50 m at Toulouse Pont-Neuf

Flood of the Garonne in 1855: 7.25 m at Toulouse Pont-Neuf

Flood of the Garonne in 1875: 9,70 m to Toulouse Pont-Neuf (or 8m32 according to vigicrue).

Flood of the Garonne in 1879: 4,87 m at Toulouse Pont-Neuf

Flood of the Garonne in 1890: 3.30 m at Toulouse Pont-Neuf

Flood of the Garonne in 1900: 4,00 m in Toulouse Pont-Neuf

Flood of the Garonne in 1905: 4.24 m at Toulouse Pont-Neuf

Crete of 1927 in Aquitaine, particularly imposing after the confluence of the Garonne with the Lot (of which it remained raw reference), insignificant upstream18.

Flood of the Garonne in 1952: 4,57 m at Toulouse Pont-Neuf

Flood of the Garonne in 1977: 4,31 m in Toulouse Pont-Neuf

Flood of the Garonne in 2000: 4.38 m at Toulouse Pont-Neuf

Flood of the Garonne in 2004: 3,52 m at Toulouse Pont-Neuf

In 1777, the Garonne suffered an extraordinary flood to the point that the priest of Bourdelles took the trouble to retranscribe the event, at the end of the acts of the year, in the parish register of baptisms, marriages and deaths.

See also
 List of rivers of Europe

References

External links
 Garonne and Gironde estuary detailed information on places, ports and moorings on the canal, by the author of Inland Waterways of France, Imray
 Navigation details for 80 French rivers and canals (French waterways website section
 History and real-time water heights of Garonne river and main tributaries

Rivers of Catalonia
Rivers of Spain
Rivers of France
 
Rivers of Gironde
Rivers of Haute-Garonne
Rivers of Lot-et-Garonne
Rivers of Tarn-et-Garonne
Rivers of Nouvelle-Aquitaine
Rivers of Occitania (administrative region)
International rivers of Europe